Metania is a genus of sponges belonging to the family Metaniidae.

The species of this genus are found in Malesia and Australia.

Species:

Metania fittkaui 
Metania godeauxi 
Metania kiliani 
Metania madagascariensis 
Metania melloleitaoi 
Metania ovogemata 
Metania pottsi 
Metania reticulata 
Metania rhodesiana 
Metania spinata 
Metania subtilis 
Metania vesparioides 
Metania vesparium

References

Sponges